Western Islands may refer to the:
Various parts of the Caroline Islands
Pattiw
Western areas in the Caroline Islands region, being Yap, Palau, and from 1907 Saipan.
Faichuk, Caroline Islands, Micronesia
 Western Islands (Amsterdam)
Western Islands (Ontario) in Georgian Bay, Ontario, Canada
Western Islands, Singapore, West Region, Singapore
Western Islands, Papua New Guinea, in the Bismarck Archipelago
Western Islands (Maryland) in the Kedges Straits, Somerset County, Maryland, United States
Outer Hebrides, Scotland, United Kingdom
Azores, Western Islands of Portugal
Western Islands (publisher), the publishing arm of the John Birch Society